So You Won't Talk is a 1935 British comedy film directed by William Beaudine and starring Monty Banks, Vera Pearce and Bertha Belmore. The screenplay concerns the owner of a restaurant, who is left a large inheritance.

Plot
The owner of a small Italian restaurant in central London is left a million pound inheritance, the only stipulation to the will being that he cannot speak or write anything for a period of one month.

Cast
 Monty Banks ...  Tony
 Vera Pearce ...  Edith
 Bertha Belmore ...  Harriet
 Enid Stamp-Taylor ...  Pauline
 Muriel Angelus ...  Katrina
 Ralph Ince ...  Ralph Younger
 Claude Dampier ...  Wilbur Whistle
 Julian Royce ...  Peebles
 A. Bromley Davenport ...  Mr. Fielding

References

External links

1935 films
1935 comedy films
1930s English-language films
Films directed by William Beaudine
British comedy films
British black-and-white films
1930s British films